George Willard (March 20, 1824 – March 26, 1901) was a politician and newspaperman from the U.S. state of Michigan. He served two terms in the U.S. House of Representatives and was also instrumental in opening the University of Michigan to women.

Biography 

Willard was born in Bolton, Vermont, where he attended school and received instruction from his father.  He moved with his parents to Battle Creek, Michigan in 1836 and graduated from Kalamazoo College in 1844.  He taught school, studied theology, and was ordained a minister of the Episcopal Church in 1848.  He served as rector of churches in Coldwater, Battle Creek, and Kalamazoo until 1863.  He was a professor of Latin in Kalamazoo College in 1863 and 1864 and engaged in newspaper work in Battle Creek.

He served as member of the Michigan State Board of Education from 1857 to 1863 and member of the Board of Regents of the University of Michigan from 1863-1872. While a regent, he was a strong proponent of the admission of women to the University of Michigan. He introduced an unsuccessful motion to that effect in 1869, but was successful on January 5, 1870, when the Board passed his resolution stating that "the board of regents recognize the  right of every resident of Michigan to the enjoyment  of the privileges afforded by the university,  and that no rule exists in any of the university statutes for the exclusion of any person from the university who possesses the requisite literary and moral qualifications."

Willard was a member of the Michigan State House of Representatives in 1866 and 1867.  He was a member of the State constitutional convention in 1867 and a delegate to the Republican National Convention in 1872.  He was elected as a Republican from Michigan's 3rd congressional district to the 43rd and 44th United States Congresses, serving from March 4, 1873 to March 3, 1877.  He was not a candidate for re-nomination in 1876.

George Willard resumed newspaper work in Battle Creek, serving as editor and owner of the Battle Creek Journal until his death.  He was interred in Oak Hill Cemetery.

Ancestry 
George Willard was a 4th great-grandson (7th generation descendant) of the Massachusetts colonist Simon Willard (1605–1676).

Notes

References

External links

The Political Graveyard 
	

1824 births
1901 deaths
People from Chittenden County, Vermont
American people of English descent
Episcopalians from Vermont
American Episcopal clergy
Republican Party members of the United States House of Representatives from Michigan
Republican Party members of the Michigan House of Representatives
People from Battle Creek, Michigan
19th-century American educators
19th-century American newspaper editors
20th-century American newspaper editors
19th-century American politicians
Kalamazoo College alumni
Kalamazoo College faculty
Regents of the University of Michigan
Burials in Michigan